1989 Academy Awards may refer to:

 61st Academy Awards, the Academy Awards ceremony that took place in 1989
 62nd Academy Awards, the 1990 ceremony honoring the best in film for 1989